Richard Keatinge may refer to:
 Richard Harte Keatinge, Irish recipient of the Victoria Cross
 Richard Keatinge (judge), Irish barrister and judge

See also
 Richard E. Keating, American astronomer